Aslam Jairajpuri (Urdu:علامہ اسلم جیراجپوری) was a scholar of Qur'an, Hadith, and Islamic history who is best known for his books Talimat-e-Qur'an and "History of Qur'an. He was Distinguished Professor of Arabic and Persian at Aligarh Muslim University and Jamia Millia Islamia.  He was born on 27 January 1882 in Jairajpur, Azamgarh, in Uttar Pradesh, India, and died on 28 December 1955 in Delhi.

Early life

His father, Salamtullah Jairajpuri (1850–1904) was a member of Ahl-e-Hadith movement (not the Ahl-e-Hadith sect), hence Allama Aslam's house at his birth, was a city center for Ahl-e-Hadith ullema. After his birth his father was asked by Nawab Siddik Hasan Khan (نواب صدیق حسن خان) to take the chair of presidency of Madrisah Vakfiah in Bhopal, which he took whilst his son stayed behind in Jairajpur. For his infancy years he was mostly raised by his maternal parents, which made him closer to the two.

His father sent him to the maktab (school) at the age of five. This school was just next to Allama Aslam's house in Jairajpur. Next year his father took him and his mother to Bhopal and enrolled him to memorise the Qur'an. After memorising Qur'an he learned Mathematics, Persian, Fiqh and Arabic. The subject of Tafsir was taught by his own father. Aslam also learned the martial arts of Bana, Bank, Banot and shooting.

In his early years, with his friend Tauqeer al-Hasan (توقیر الحسن), after research and discussion regarding the reason of tradition (تقلید) for a long time, these two scholars came to the conclusion that according to principles of Fiqh, i.e. Muslim Jurisprudence, the laws can be changed and amended according to the time and necessity.

After finishing the education, in 1903 Aslam Jairajpuri joined Paisa Newspaper in Lahore, as a translator. Next year in June 1904 he received the letter regarding his father's illness and he hurried back to Bhopal. Next day his father died. It was 15 June 1904 / 30 Rabi-ul-Avval 1322.

In 1904 Aslam met with Maulvi Abdullah Chakralvi (مولوی عبداللہ چکڑالوی). When he heard that he did not believe in all hadith but after a discussion of three hours he was not able to convince Allama Aslam of his own ideas. Even after this, Aslam kept searching about the true place of hadith in Islam.

Professor at Aligarh Muslim University

In 1906 Aslam came to Aligarh College and for six years taught Arabic and Persian at college level. In 1912 he was put in charge of the Eastern section of the Litton Library of the college where he catalogued the books. When the college turned into Aligarh Muslim University, he was made the professor of Arabic and Persian.

This was around 1912 when he was in Aligarh Muslim University, that which he wrote "Talemat-e-Koran."

Professor at Jamia Millia Islamia

See also Jamia Millia Islamia

At the insistence of Maulana Mohammad Ali, he left the job, joined Jamia Millia Islamia where he taught history of Islam, hadith, and Qur'an. He wrote many scholarly articles in the journal "Jamia" of the Jamia Millia Islamia. He was so famous in this Jamia, (University), for his knowledge and scholarship, that if someone uttered the only word Mualana, (Arabic name for doctor or scholar), all the persons understood that he meant Mualana Aslam Jairajpuri.

He was also a regular contributor of The Journal Tolu-e-Islam. He was also a friend and fan of Muhammad Iqbal, and visited him many time. Muhammad Iqbal had a great respect for him due to his scholarship of Qur'an.

His meeting with Ghulam Ahmed Pervez

See also Ghulam Ahmed Pervez

Ghulam Ahmed Pervez respected him. It was in 1930, when he, Ghulam Ahmed Pervez, (aged 27 years at that time), read one of his article in this journal, and was so impressed by him, that he requested him for an appointment, and thereafter he became his disciple and friend. Maulana Aslam Jairajpuri also wrote introduction for the first edition of "Ma'arf Qur'an" written by Ghulam Ahmed Pervez. After the emergence of Pakistan Maulana Aslam Jairajpuri, who lived in Delhi, visited Pakistan at the request of Ghulam Ahmed Pervez, and stayed at his home in Karachi. Afterwards Ghulam Ahmed Pervez published his many books including "Tareekh-al-Ummat", "Novadrat"  from his publication house "Idara Tolu-e-Islam".

Qur'an and hadith

The question of status of Qur'an and Hadith in the Islamic history is a complex one. Maulana Aslam Jairajpuri also solved this subject in his many books.Though was doing fine in his practical world, but in his spiritual world he was still haunted by only one subject, namely: the position of Hadith in Islam. This he ultimately solved and in his own words, "When Allah showed me the facts of Qur'an at that point I came to know the position of hadith in Qur'an, which is history of Islam. To consider the hadith as Islam is not correct. If they were in Islam, then Muhammad would also have left a written manuscript of these, like he did in case of Qur'an. For Islam, Qur'an is enough which is a complete book and in which Islam has been finalized.

However, this position regarding hadith is in contradiction with its historically accepted status among majority school of thoughts. Many scholars after him gave befitting answers to the objections raised by Maulana Jairajpuri. One example is Maulana Abdur Rahman Kilani, who wrote an extensive book named "Aina-e-Parveziat" which addressed many questions about the status of Hadith in Islam.

Works

Quranic scholarship

1. Talimat-e-Koran – تعلیمات قرآن

This book is about the rules and regulations proving that Koran is enough to explain itself and Koran in itself is complete. Based on this, his friend Allama Ghulam Ahmed Pervez did his magnificent "Mafhoom-ul-Koran"

2 . Tarikh-ul- Qur'an – تاریخ القرآن

This scholarly book is about the history of Qur'an, its revelation, its compilation, and later development. this book also deals with all the concepts related to Qur'an.

Publications

3.Tarikh-ul-Ummat – تاریخ الامّت in Seven Volumes

This is one of the best written books on the history of Islamic Nation. This book only considers the authentic and rationale historical evidences in its inclusion.

4. Risala Mehjob-al-Arth – رسالہ محجوب الارث

Allama Aslam has proved in this by Qur'an and hadith that even by fiqh orphaned children cannot be left out of the will.

5. Novadrat – نوادرات

This book contains Allama Aslam's articles.

6. Fateh Misr – فاتح مصر

This book is the biography of conqueror of Egypt, Umar bin al-As's history

7. Hayat-e-Hafiz – حیات حافظ

This book is Khwaja Hafiz Shirazi's biography.

8. Hayat-e-Jami – حیات جامی

9. Akaed-e-Islam – عقائد اسلام

10. Arkan-e-Islam – ارکان اسلام

11. Tarikh-e-Najad – تاریخ نجد

12. Al-Wrath fil-Islam – الوراثۃ فی الاسلام
This book includes all the things with (dalail) which entered in Hanfi Fiqh and are against Koranic Teachings.

Notes

External links

Books by Allama Aslam Jairajpri: 

Tareekh-al-Ummat Volume 1 :  

Tareekh-al-Ummat Volume 2: 

People from Azamgarh
Muhammad Iqbal
Indian Muslims
20th-century Muslim scholars of Islam
Islamic philosophers
Jamia Millia Islamia
1955 deaths
1882 births